Jason Jordan (born May 30, 1978) is a retired professional soccer player who formerly played for the Vancouver Whitecaps in the First Division of the United Soccer Leagues. He is currently Vancouver's third all-time leading scorer with 74 goals in 207 games. Jason Jordan is also the Technical Director of the CSA National Youth Licensed Club, Fusion Football Club.

Career
Born in Richmond, British Columbia, Jordan began playing college soccer at Langara College in 1998 and 1999. He signed with the Vancouver 86ers in 1997.

In June 2002, he turned down a contract offer from the Colorado Rapids of Major League Soccer in favour of remaining with the Whitecaps.

In the 2005 season he enjoyed a career year with the Whitecaps being named 2005 USL First Division MVP and lead the league with 17 goals. That same year, Jordan was named Whitecaps Player of the Year, was presented with the "Domenic Mobilio Golden Boot", and shared the Supporter's MVP award with goalkeeper Mike Franks.

Unfortunately, he suffered numerous injuries in 2006 that restricted him to playing only six games in the regular season and two games in the playoffs. Despite limited action, he tallied two assists and fired six shots in his regular season appearances as the Whitecaps won the USL First Division Championship, beating the Rochester Raging Rhinos 3–0.

On December 19, 2008, Jordan was released from the Vancouver Whitecaps and retired few days later.

International
Jordan played on the Canada Under-20 and Under-23 national teams.

Jason Jordan has also represented Canada at the CONCACAF Mens U20 in Mexico, FIFA Youth World Cup in Malaysia, and as a member of the U23 National Team at the PAN-AM Games. In 2003, he was on the Canadian National Futsal team and in 2005 with Frank Yallop's National Team squad in the US.

Coaching career 

Jason Jordan is technical director of Fusion Football Club, a CSA National Youth Licensed Club based in Vancouver and Richmond that has teams in the British Columbia Soccer Premier League and BC Coastal Soccer League.

He has been involved with the Vancouver Selects, Crofton House, Whitecaps FC Academy, and Coastal FC and is the founding technical director of Fusion FC and Vancouver FC.

Honours

Canada
CONCACAF U-20 Championship (1): 1996

Vancouver Whitecaps FC
USL First Division Championship (2): 2006, 2008

Individual
USL First Division Top Scorer: 2005

References

1978 births
Living people
Soccer people from British Columbia
Canadian soccer players
Association football forwards
People from Richmond, British Columbia
USISL players
USL First Division players
Vancouver Whitecaps (1986–2010) players
Canada men's youth international soccer players
Canada men's under-23 international soccer players
Langara College people